Sir David Roxbee Cox  (15 July 1924 – 18 January 2022) was a British statistician and educator. His wide-ranging contributions to the field of statistics included introducing logistic regression, the proportional hazards model and the Cox process, a point process named after him. 

He was a professor of statistics at Birkbeck College, London, Imperial College London and the University of Oxford, and served as Warden of Nuffield College, Oxford. The first recipient of the International Prize in Statistics, he also received the Guy, George Box and Copley medals, as well as a knighthood.

Early life
Cox was born in Birmingham on 15 July 1924. His father was a die sinker and part-owner of a jewellery shop, and they lived near the Jewellery Quarter. The aeronautical engineer Harold Roxbee Cox was a distant cousin. He attended Handsworth Grammar School, Birmingham. He received a Master of Arts in mathematics at St John's College, Cambridge, and obtained his PhD from the University of Leeds in 1949, advised by Henry Daniels and Bernard Welch. His dissertation was entitled Theory of Fibre Motion.

Career
Cox was employed from 1944 to 1946 at the Royal Aircraft Establishment, from 1946 to 1950 at the Wool Industries Research Association in Leeds, and from 1950 to 1955 worked at the Statistical Laboratory at the University of Cambridge. From 1956 to 1966 he was Reader and then Professor of Statistics at Birkbeck College, London. In 1966, he took up the Chair position in Statistics at Imperial College London where he later became head of the mathematics department. In 1988 he became Warden of Nuffield College and a member of the Department of Statistics at Oxford University. He formally retired from these positions in 1994, but continued to work at Oxford.

Cox supervised, collaborated with, and encouraged many notable researchers prominent in statistics. He collaborated with George Box on a study of transformations such as the Box–Cox transformation and they were especially delighted to be credited as Box and Cox.  He was the doctoral advisor of David Hinkley, Peter McCullagh, Basilio de Bragança Pereira, Wally Smith, Gauss Moutinho Cordeiro, Valerie Isham, Henry Wynn and Jane Hutton. He served as president of the Bernoulli Society from 1979 to 1981, of the Royal Statistical Society from 1980 to 1982, and of the International Statistical Institute from 1995 to 1997. He was an Honorary Fellow of Nuffield College and St John's College, Cambridge, and was a member of the Department of Statistics at the University of Oxford.

Personal life
In 1947, Cox married Joyce Drummond, and they had four children. He died on 18 January 2022, at the age of 97.

Research
Cox made pioneering and important contributions to numerous areas of statistics and applied probability, of which the best known are:

 Logistic regression, which is employed when the variable to be predicted is categorical (i.e., can take a limited number of values, e.g., gender, race (in the US census)), binary (a special case of categorical with only two values - e.g., success/failure, disease/no disease), or ordinal, where the categories can be ranked (e.g., pain intensity can be absent, mild, moderate, severe, unbearable). Cox's 1958 paper  and further publications in the 1960s addressed the case of binary logistic regression.
 The proportional hazards model, which is widely used in the analysis of survival data, was developed by him in 1972. An example of the use of the proportional hazards model is in survival analysis in medical research. The model can be used in clinical trials to investigate time-based information about cohorts of patients, such as their response to exposure to certain chemical substances.
 The Cox process was named after him.

Awards
Cox received numerous awards and honours for his work. He was awarded the Guy Medals in Silver (1961) and Gold (1973) of the Royal Statistical Society. He was elected Fellow of the Royal Society of London in 1973. The next year, he was elected to the American Academy of Arts and Sciences. He was knighted by Queen Elizabeth II in 1985. He was elected to the American Philosophical Society in 1990. Cox became an Honorary Fellow of the British Academy in 1997 and was a Fellow of the American Statistical Association. He was a Foreign Associate of the US National Academy of Sciences and a foreign member of the Royal Danish Academy of Sciences and Letters. In 1990, he won the Kettering Prize and Gold Medal for Cancer Research for "the development of the Proportional Hazard Regression Model." In 2010 he was awarded the Copley Medal of the Royal Society "for his seminal contributions to the theory and applications of statistics", the same year in which he was elected a foreign fellow of the Royal Society of Canada. He was also the first ever recipient of the International Prize in Statistics. He received the award in 2016. In 2013 Cox was elected an Honorary Fellow of the Royal Society of Edinburgh. In 2016, he won the BBVA Foundation Frontiers of Knowledge Award in the Basic Sciences category jointly with Bradley Efron, for the development of "pioneering and hugely influential" statistical methods that have proved indispensable for obtaining reliable results in a vast spectrum of disciplines from medicine to astrophysics, genomics or particle physics.

Publications 
Cox wrote or co-authored over 300 papers and books. From 1966 to 1991 he was the editor of Biometrika. His books are as follows:

Planning of experiments (1958)
Queues (Methuen, 1961).  With Walter L. Smith
Renewal Theory (Methuen, 1962).
The theory of stochastic processes (1965).  With Hilton David Miller
Analysis of binary data (1969).  With Joyce Snell
Theoretical statistics (1974).  With D. V. Hinkley
Problems and Solutions in Theoretical Statistics (1978).  With D. V. Hinkley
Point Processes (Chapman & Hall/CRC, 1980).  With Valerie Isham
Applied statistics, principles and examples (Chapman & Hall/CRC, 1981).  With Joyce Snell
Analysis of survival data (Chapman & Hall/CRC, 1984).  With David Oakes
Asymptotic techniques for use in statistics. (1989) With Ole E. Barndorff-Nielsen
Inference and asymptotics (Chapman & Hall/CRC, 1994).  With Ole E. Barndorff-Nielsen
Multivariate dependencies: models, analysis and interpretation (Chapman & Hall, 1995).  With Nanny Wermuth
The theory of design of experiments.  (Chapman & Hall/CRC, 2000).  With Nancy M. Reid
Complex stochastic systems (Chapman & Hall/CRC, 2000).  With Ole E. Barndorff-Nielsen and Claudia Klüppelberg
Components of variance (Chapman & Hall/CRC, 2003).  With P. J. Solomon
Principles of Statistical Inference (Cambridge University Press, 2006). 
Selected Statistical Papers of Sir David Cox 2 Volume Set
Principles of Applied Statistics (CUP). With Christl A. Donnelly

He was named editor of the following books:

 
 
 
 

The following book was published in his honour:

 Celebrating Statistics: Papers in honour of Sir David Cox on his 80th birthday

See also 
 Logrank test

References

External links 

 Sir David Cox – homepage at web-site of University of Oxford.
 The certificate of election to the Royal Society is available at Cox, David Roxbee
 There are two photographs at Portraits of Statisticians
 Cox's time in the Cambridge Statistical Laboratory is recounted in The History of the Cambridge Statistical Laboratory 
 Summary of his life and work, page 3 of ENBIS News, Winter/Spring 2006
 For Cox's PhD students see  page.

1924 births
2022 deaths
20th-century British mathematicians
Academics of Birkbeck, University of London
Academics of Imperial College London
Alumni of St John's College, Cambridge
Alumni of the University of Leeds
Elected Members of the International Statistical Institute
English mathematicians
English statisticians
Fellows of Nuffield College, Oxford
Fellows of St John's College, Cambridge
Fellows of the American Statistical Association
Fellows of the Royal Society
Foreign associates of the National Academy of Sciences
Honorary Fellows of the British Academy
Knights Bachelor
Members of Academia Europaea
People educated at Handsworth Grammar School
People from Birmingham, West Midlands
Presidents of the International Statistical Institute
Presidents of the Royal Statistical Society
Queueing theorists
Recipients of the Copley Medal
Wardens of Nuffield College, Oxford
Members of the American Philosophical Society
Mathematical statisticians